Major General Ni Lin Aung is a Burmese military officer and current commander of the Eastern Central Command, which comprises central Shan State. Before being appointed in August 2022, he served as the commander of the Eastern Command. In February 2022, in the aftermath of the 2021 Myanmar coup d'etat, he was sanctioned by the European Union for violating human rights and committing military atrocities and abuses against civilians, particularly for his culpability in the Mo So massacre in December 2021. As of January 2022, he held the rank of Major General.

See also 

 2021–2023 Myanmar civil war
 State Administration Council
 Tatmadaw

References 

Living people
Burmese generals
Year of birth missing (living people)